Zamia oreillyi is a species of cycad in the family Zamiaceae endemic to Honduras. It occurs in a single location in Atlántida Department, Honduras near Hacienda Agua Caliente, which is about 2 km southwest of Jutiapa.

References

Whitelock, Loran M. 2002. The Cycads. Portland: Timber Press.

External links
 

oreillyi